The 2006 PBZ Zagreb Indoors was a men's tennis tournament held on indoor carpet courts. It was the inaugural edition of the PBZ Zagreb Indoors and was part of the ATP International Series of the 2006 ATP Tour. It took place at the Dom Sportova in Zagreb, Croatia from 30 January through 6 February 2006. First-seeded Ivan Ljubičić won the singles title.

Finals

Singles

 Ivan Ljubičić defeated  Stefan Koubek 6–3, 6–4
 It was Ljubičić's 2nd singles title of the year and the 5th of his career.

Doubles

 Jaroslav Levinský /  Michal Mertiňák defeated  Davide Sanguinetti /  Andreas Seppi 7–6(9–7), 6–1

External links 
 ATP tournament profile
 Official website
 Singles draw
 Doubles draw
 Qualifying Singles draw

 
PBZ Zagreb Indoors
Zagreb Indoors
2006 in Croatian tennis